Paul Côté (28 January 1944 – 19 July 2013) was a Canadian sailor. He won a bronze medal in the Soling Class at the 1972 Summer Olympics. Côté was co-founder of Greenpeace and headed many successful business ventures in Canada and the United States, including Genstar and Newland Group.

References
 
 Paul Côté's obituary

1944 births
2013 deaths
Sportspeople from Vancouver
Canadian male sailors (sport)
Olympic sailors of Canada
Olympic bronze medalists for Canada
Olympic medalists in sailing
Medalists at the 1972 Summer Olympics
Sailors at the 1972 Summer Olympics – Soling
20th-century Canadian people